Mac Styslinger (born September 6, 1993) is an American former professional tennis player.

Styslinger grew up in the Birmingham suburb of Mountain Brook and trained at the IMG Bollettieri Academy in Florida. He is the son of tennis player Mark Styslinger, a two-time All-American for SMU who also achieved a world ranking.

A top-30 junior, Styslinger made the boys' singles quarter-finals of the 2011 Australian Open, beating Nick Kyrgios en route. He played collegiate tennis for the University of Virginia and was a member of three NCAA championship teams. In 2013 he teamed up with Jarmere Jenkins to win the NCAA doubles championships. This earned them a wildcard to the doubles main draw of the 2013 US Open, where they fell in the first round to Michaël Llodra and Nicolas Mahut.

ITF Futures titles

Doubles: (2)

References

External links
 
 

1993 births
Living people
American male tennis players
Virginia Cavaliers men's tennis players
Tennis people from Alabama
Sportspeople from Birmingham, Alabama
People from Mountain Brook, Alabama